Joy Anwulika Alphonsus (born 31 August 1987), popularly as Joy Alphonsus, is a Nigerian-born actor. She is best known for the titular role in the critically acclaimed award-winning film Joy.

Personal life
She was born on 31 August 1987 in Nigeria. She currently lives in Austria.

Career
She made her first cinema appearance in 2018 with the blockbuster Austrian feature film Joy directed by Sudabeh Mortezai. In the film she played the title role. The film had its premiere on 30 August 2018 as part of the 75th Venice Film Festival. The film was later invited to the Giornate degli Autori section. The film was screened and awarded at several international film festivals. In November 2018, Alphonsus won the award for the Best Actress at the Seville International Film Festival. In January 2019, she was awarded the Max Ophüls Prize in Saarbrücken for her role. In the same year, she won the Diagonale Acting Award. In 2020, she was awarded in the Best Female Actress category at the Austrian Film Awards.

Filmography

References

External links
 
 Foreign Oscar: film from Austria disqualified

Living people
Austrian film actresses
1987 births
Nigerian film actresses
21st-century Nigerian actresses